Reg Gaffley (born 1 September 1929) was a South African weightlifter. He competed in the men's bantamweight event at the 1956 Summer Olympics.

References

External links

1929 births
Possibly living people
South African male weightlifters
Olympic weightlifters of South Africa
Weightlifters at the 1956 Summer Olympics
Place of birth missing
Commonwealth Games medallists in weightlifting
Commonwealth Games gold medallists for South Africa
Weightlifters at the 1958 British Empire and Commonwealth Games
Medallists at the 1958 British Empire and Commonwealth Games